Babubhai J. Patel became Chief Minister of Gujarat twice. In 1974 Chimanbhai Patel resigned from the post of Chief Minister due to Nav Nirman movement and the assembly  was dissolved. On subsequent election to the assembly Babubhai Patel became the Chief Minister of the first non-Congress government of Gujarat on 18 June 1975. He led the coalition of parties known as Janata Morcha. After a week, emergency was imposed by Indira Gandhi and he had to resign in March 1976. He again became Chief Minister in 1977 as a leader of Janata Party and remained until 1980 when his government was dismissed. Here is the list of ministers of his second  ministry (1977-80)

Cabinet ministers

Babubhai J. Patel as Chief minister
Keshubhai Patel
Shankarsinh Vaghela
Harisinh Chavda
Bhanjibhai Patel
Bhimabhai Rathod
Maneklal Gandhi
Bhailalbhai Contractor
Rasikchandra Acharya
Navin Chandra Barot as labour minister
Poptalal Vyas
Hemaben Acharya
Chandubhai Deshmukh
Lallubhai Sheth
Motibhai Chaudhary
Navalbhai Shah
Makrandbhai Desai
Dineshbhai Shah

Ministers of State

Kokilaben Vyas
Mohmed Surti
Bhavsinh Jhala
Dr Devjibhai Vanvi
Harihar Khambholja
Maganbhai Solanki

Deputy ministers

Kiratsinh Gohil
Balvantrai Manvar
Purushottam Makwana
Khimji Jesang
Lalit Patel

References

Patel B
1977 establishments in Gujarat
Janata Party state ministries
1980 disestablishments in India
Cabinets established in 1977
Cabinets disestablished in 1980